Zinédine Machach (born 5 January 1996) is a French professional footballer who plays as a midfielder for Greek Super League club Ionikos.

Career 
Machach began his youth career with SC Air Bel, before moving to first AS Cannes and since Olympique Marseille. He then joined Toulouse in 2014. He made his Ligue 1 debut on 23 May 2015 against OGC Nice. He replaced Aleksandar Pešić after 58 minutes.

On 27 July 2016, Machach joined Olympique Marseille on a season-long loan deal with an option to buy.

On 21 July 2018, Machach joined to Serie B side Carpi on loan until 30 June 2019.

On 23 January 2019, Machach joined to Crotone on loan  until 30 June 2019.

On 2 September 2019, he joined Cosenza on loan.

On 2 July 2022, Machach signed a two-year deal with Ionikos in Greece.

Career statistics

Personal life 
Machach was born in Marseille, France, and was born to an Algerian mother and a Moroccan father .

References

1996 births
Living people
Footballers from Marseille
Association football midfielders
French footballers
Championnat National 3 players
Ligue 1 players
Championnat National 2 players
Serie A players
Serie B players
Eredivisie players
Nemzeti Bajnokság I players
Super League Greece players
Toulouse FC players
Olympique de Marseille players
S.S.C. Napoli players
A.C. Carpi players
F.C. Crotone players
Cosenza Calcio players
VVV-Venlo players
Budapest Honvéd FC players
Ionikos F.C. players
French sportspeople of Algerian descent
French sportspeople of Moroccan descent
French expatriate footballers
Expatriate footballers in Italy
French expatriate sportspeople in Italy
Expatriate footballers in the Netherlands
French expatriate sportspeople in the Netherlands
Expatriate footballers in Hungary
French expatriate sportspeople in Hungary
Expatriate footballers in Greece
French expatriate sportspeople in Greece